Landcross may refer to:

Landcross, Devon, a village in England
Landcross, the combined form of the Multiforce team, in the fictional universe of the Transformers